Cartography and Geographic Information Science is an academic journal about cartography and geographic information science published by Taylor & Francis on behalf of the U.S. Cartography and Geographic Information Society,
in affiliation with the International Cartographic Association.
Its editor-in-chief is Alexander Ken;
its 2018 impact factor is 2.271.

It started in 1974 as The American Cartographer, was renamed in 1990 to Cartography and Geographic Information Systems, and in 1999 received its current name.

Indexing
The journal is abstracted and indexed in the following bibliographic databases:

References

Taylor & Francis academic journals
Academic journals associated with learned and professional societies of the United States
Geography journals
Cartography
Publications established in 1974
Bimonthly journals
Geographic information science